Giovanni Antonio Emanueli (Brescia, 1817 – Milan, 1894) was an Italian painter.

Biography
Emanueli enrolled at the Milan Academy of Fine Arts in 1831 and attended Antonio Durelli’s course of figure studies but was enabled to complete his training under the sculptor Abbondio Sangiorgio from 1833 on by a grant from the Brescia City Council. His youthful work shows the influence of the classically inspired models of his master and Rodolfo Vantini, with whom he collaborated repeatedly on important building projects in Brescia. He settled in Milan in 1842 but continued to send works from his repertoire of religious and funerary subjects, portraits and genre compositions to his hometown. He produced some sculptures for Milan Cathedral and the church of San Carlo al Corso in the period 1857–69 and took part in the 4th Esposizione Nazionale di Belle Arti in Turin in 1880. The works of the artist’s mature period show the adoption of a naturalistic approach under the influence of Alessandro Puttinati, Giovanni Strazza and Antonio Tantardini.

References
 Elena Lissoni, Giovanni Antonio Emanueli, online catalogue Artgate by Fondazione Cariplo, 2010, CC BY-SA (source for the first revision of this article).

Other projects

19th-century Italian painters
Italian male painters
Painters from Milan
1817 births
1894 deaths
19th-century Italian male artists